The Mayor of Reggio Calabria is an elected politician who, along with the Reggio Calabria's City Council, is accountable for the strategic government of Reggio Calabria in Calabria, Italy.

The current Mayor is Giuseppe Falcomatà, a member of the Democratic Party, who took office on 29 October 2014.

Kingdom of Italy (1861–1946)

Italian Republic (since 1946)
From 1946 to 1997, the Mayor of Reggio Calabria was elected by the City Council.

Notes

Since 1997, enacting a new law on local administrations, the Mayor of Reggio Calabria is chosen by direct election, originally every four, and since 2001 every five years.

Notes

References

Reggio Calabria
Mayors
Politics of Calabria